Treasure Island is a 1986 fabulist metafiction film directed by Chilean filmmaker Raúl Ruiz, which was screened in the Un Certain Regard section of the 1991 Cannes Film Festival. French, British and American companies funded Ruiz's obscure and complex adaptation of the classic 1883 coming-of-age adventure novel by Robert Louis Stevenson. Treasure Island stars a young Melvil Poupaud, a familiar face in Ruiz's filmography, alongside popular veteran actors such as Martin Landau, Anna Karina and Jean-Pierre Léaud.

The film's play on the traditional narrative of an iconic and frequently dramatized story is very representative of Ruiz' oneiric approach and style. Ruiz takes his fondness for cartography to a new level with Stevenson's narrative, making the book into a map to the treasure in this rendition.

Plot
Treasure Island opens with the narrator, who is both the main character, Jonathan, and Jim Hawkins (Melvil Poupaud), describing a violent television show that he is watching about African civil war and the theft of diamonds. Then the film moves to the shabby hotel owned and run by Jonathan's drunken father (Lou Castel), and peculiar mother (Anna Karina) where they take in as few guests as possible.
A mysterious man (Martin Landau) arrives at the hotel, and asks to be called "Captain." Jonathan begins to analyze him through the "eye of god:" a hole in the ceiling of the Captain's room. He realizes that this man is no stranger but actually quite familiar with his parents.

While tending to guests on the terrace, a strange blind man (Charles Schmidt) approaches Jon. The man is relentless in wanting to speak with Jonathan about the Captain.

The Captain attempts to bribe Jonathan into not sharing that he is staying at the hotel, to which Jonathan responds it's too late. As his mother watches, the Captain drugs him. While drugged, Jon sleepwalks, and is unable to tell if he is awake or asleep. He sees a fight between the Captain and his father. His mother screams at him to go back to sleep.

After fully regaining consciousness, Jonathan ventures to a cave where he can retreat for days at time. He looks outside to see the blind man dancing. He escapes back to the hotel, where a man, Midas (Jean-Pierre Léaud), sits at a typewriter. Midas seems to know everything about Jonathan. The blind man then appears at the hotel, and tries to grab Jonathan.

The Captain's familiarity is explained when Jonathan's mother and he are seen giggling and holding each other: it is obvious now that they are lovers. They begin to mock the husband; drunkenly, as Jonathan watches.

Jonathan leaves the hotel. He eventually runs into a man on the side of the road, named Silver (Vic Tayback). He offers Jonathan a place to stay and a ride. Jon then begins to notice that Silver also knows everything about him. As he heads off to sleep, a random person in the hall claims to be Jonathan's father. Silver makes the stranger leave. Off to bed, Jonathan grabs a book:  Treasure Island. He comments “that book accounted for Silver’s entire secret library”.

Jonathan returns home and arrives to find his Father's funeral is in progress. Jonathan is not upset by, but rather indifferent to, his father's death: to him, it only means he will never have to loathe him again. Jon then awakes to a room of people, one being a doctor (Lou Castel). It is gathered that he fainted at the funeral. The doctor purposefully scares Jonathan. His mother watches, laughing. She urges the doctor to stop, as she believes Jon's memory is gone. She claims Jon thinks other people are his father, which at this point in the film is not ridiculous as there are a few people who could potentially be his biological father. There are now a few guests; the doctor, a millionaire, and the Captain along with a new family member, Aunt Helen (Sheila). Everyone is reading Treasure Island.

The Captain has now gone insane. He refuses to see anyone but Jonathan. Jon goes to visit the captain and sees that he has annotated Treasure Island. He notices that there is a character named Silver, and that his lines echoed that of the Silver he had met a few days earlier. The Captain is dying. He asks Jonathan to promise to read every book (all the treasure islands) carefully, because the entire fate of the western world depends on it. Before He dies he tells Jonathan that he is his actual father.

Jonathan begins to prepare for a trip in search of treasure. There is now a new Captain, who is French (Yves Afonso). The group includes the doctor, a millionaire, Silver, and other familiar faces. There are two groups, Silver's and the French Captain's. Jon is continually pestered by Silver to come to his side. Jon refuses and stays with the French Captain. He then overhears Silver saying that all of the other crew must go. The captain and his crew abandon ship in a rowboat.

The group eventually makes it to another boat where there is yet another captain (Pedro Armendáriz Jr.). Once on the ship, they discover Silver and his crew are already there as hostages, along with Helen. As Helen and Jon enjoy a few moments on deck before being forced back beneath, they begin to talk about morals: she explains that the men on the ship are lacking morals because they are all playing a game.

The group has finally found Treasure Island. Jon, below deck with his group, notices that one of the men on the crew is the man from Silver's house who claimed he was his father. He deceives him by bringing up this sensitive father-son topic, and the group is able to flee above deck.

They land on Skeleton Beach, giving space between themselves and Silver. They decide to attack after lunch. The battle scene looks similar to the opening show. Jon comments that it is a “funny sort of battle,” as there are no bullets: it is all fake.

The voice of the narrator switches from Jon to someone else. The narrator comments that he has been speaking as Jonathan in the first person, because he feels that he is a witness and so he can accurately share what has happened. He then makes it clear that now he will speak as himself. Jonathan then reappears, and takes control of the ship. He runs into his ersatz father, Israel Hands (Jean Francois Stévenin), on board, who when trying to overtake Jon loses his hands.

Back on land, Jon is captured and brought to Silver, and asks him if he actually knows Treasure Island. A man appears and begins to explain Treasure Island. He explains that there is a book, and a game. The game was invented by Silver, who is a professor. And then Silver introduces the man as an expert in limited game theory. Silver goes on to explain that the whole world is playing a game that abides by sacred rules. And whoever discovers these rules can control the world.

Then Helen and the doctor appear, and the expert is shot. Jon then doesn't want to play anymore. Near by, the millionaire and a strange man sit and talk about the diamonds of the island.

Silver, still distraught that his colleague was killed, comments that he was his "best Silver" ever with this man. He rants that this man was also the best Jim Hawkins ever. Jon than asks if the man was him (meaning Jim), and Silver comments that he was better than Jonathan. Helen then shoots Silver.

It is then shared that the narrator is Ben Gunn (Tony Jessen), who is the strange man with the diamonds. He explains that this game was a failure, and they will play again. But, he comments that the game is always interesting when it ends in Silver's death. Jon then realizes that all of these people have played before. Ben then asks Jon if he will play again. He responds yes, but asks Ben to guess who he will be. Ben tells him that he would make a great Silver, and comments that he himself has never played Jim Hawkins, but that he must report on how Jim Hawkins feels in the cyclical adventures of Treasure Island. The film ends with Jonathan running on the beach while the dead are being buried. Ben then kills Jon on the beach, because he doesn't want him to play again, for he is the only Jim Hawkins.

Cast
 Melvil Poupaud as Jim Hawkins / Jonathan
 Martin Landau as Old Captain
 Vic Tayback as Long John Silver
 Lou Castel as Doctor / Father
 Jeffrey Kime as Timothy (The Squire)
 Anna Karina as Mother
 Sheila as Aunt
 Jean-François Stévenin as Israel Hands (The Rat)
 Charles Schmidt as The blind man
 Jean-Pierre Léaud as Midas
 Yves Afonso as French captain
 Pedro Armendáriz Jr. as Mendoza

Reception
The film was shown at the 1991 Cannes Film Festival but did not win any awards. Although it was more popular in Europe, it was not the hit that its American investors were hoping for.

Themes
Ruiz is renowned for making complex stories, without following the traditional narrative structure. Unlike his other films, Treasure Island uses the structure and characters of the novel. When re-reading the book he found that the structure was stronger than the material. Ruiz found that life is made up of these types of stories:“We play amidst these stories, sometimes being involved in two or three of them at once. In one you’re a hero, in another a secondary character. These scripts are the society in which we live-…” ~Raúl RuizThese ideas are obvious towards the end of the film, when the game is introduced. Jonathan/Jim is actually asked which character he will play next. This philosophy of Ruiz' foreshadows role-playing gaming, which began to take off shortly after this film was made. The idea that we are all playing a game, and are all different characters at points in our stories is one of the main themes of the movie.

Cartography is also an important theme in Treasure Island, as well as many of Ruiz's other films. The entire film is based on the idea that the book is a map to the treasure. The importance of cartography for Ruiz is not only his complex background as a Chilean exile, but in his reinvention of the way stories are told. In this film much time is spent developing the idea that even a familiar story can be told in many different ways

Further reading
 Translated into English as:  Translated from the French by Paul Buck and Catherine Petit.

References

External links

The Black Spot: Raoul Ruiz and Treasure Island review by JW McCormack at n+1 Magazine (2011)
À la recherche de L'Île perdue Master's thesis by Edmund Stenson (2015)

1986 films
1980s adventure films
Chilean drama films
Films directed by Raúl Ruiz
Films produced by Paulo Branco
Treasure Island (1985)
French adventure films
Golan-Globus films
1980s English-language films
Chilean coming-of-age films
1980s French films
Chilean adventure films